The Joint Committee on Tax Law Rewrite Bills was a joint committee of the Parliament of the United Kingdom. The remit of the committee was to scrutinise bills intended to make the language of tax law simpler, while preserving the effect of the existing law, subject to minor changes. It scrutinized the Tax Law Rewrite Project.

History
The Joint Committee on Tax Simplification sat between January 2001 to May 2002. It was replaced by the Joint Committee on Tax Law Rewrite Bills in May 2002, which scrutinised the Tax Law Rewrite Project until April 2010.

The committee has not been active since then.

Membership 
As of December 2019, the membership of the committee has not been selected for the current Parliament.

See also
Joint Committee of the Parliament of the United Kingdom
Parliamentary Committees of the United Kingdom

References

External links
The records of the Joint Committee on Tax Law Rewrite Bills are held by the Parliamentary Archives
Joint Committee on Tax Simplification (January 2001 to May 2002) 
Joint Committee on Tax Law Rewrite Bills (May 2002 to April 2010)
Joint Committee on Tax Law Rewrite Bills website (2007)
Joint Committee on Tax Rewrite Bills from May 2010

Tax
Select Committees of the British House of Commons
Tax policy